Sundaresvarar Temple is a Siva temple in Koranattukarupur near Kumbakonam in Thanjavur district in Tamil Nadu, India.

Location
This temple is located at Karupur also known as Koranattukarupur in Kumbakonam-Chennai road, at a distance of 3 km from Kumbakonam. As there were more number of Pathiri trees, this place was called as Koranattukarupur.

Structure
The temple has five tier Rajagopura. In the sanctum sanctorum, the presiding deity is in the form of Lingam, facing east. The shrine of Goddess is facing south. In the first Prakaram, Vahana mandapa, kitchen, yagasala are found. In the south west sanctum sanctorum, is found. In the second prakara, Dakshinamurthi, Vinayaka, Subramania, Saptamathar, Mahalakshmi, Durga are found. In the north Nataraja, and Bairava, are found. In the North east Navagraha is found. There is a separate shrine for Petti Kaliamman.

Presiding deity
The presiding deity is known as Sundaresvarar, Sundarar and Lokasundarar. The Goddess is known as Abirami. Kumbhabhishekham of this temple took place during March 2018.

Panchakorsa Sthalam
This is one of the Panchakrosa Sthalams, a cluster of five Siva temples connected with Mahamaham festival of Kumbakonam. Other temples are Tiruvidaimaruthur, Tirunagesvaram, Darasuram and Swamimalai.

Vaippu Sthalam
Very near to this temple, a temple known as Agastisvarar Temple is found. It is one of the Vaippu Sthalams sung by Tamil Saivite Nayanar Sundarar.

Gallery

References

External links
 அருள்மிகு சுந்தரேஸ்வரர் திருக்கோயில், தினமலர் கோயில்கள்
 Sundareswarar Temple, Dinamalar Temples

Shiva temples in Thanjavur district